Brandon Wegher (born ) is a former American football running back. He played college football for one season at the University of Iowa in 2009, rushing for 641 yards and a freshman record eight touchdowns. He also played two seasons at Morningside College in 2013–2014, where he was an NAIA national All-American. In 2014, he set a new NAIA national rushing record with 2,610 yards.  His younger brother, Jack Wegher, played running back in three games during the 2016–2017 season at Purdue University. His father, Rick, played college football at South Dakota State University and then professionally in Canada.

Professional career

Carolina Panthers
After going undrafted in the 2015 NFL Draft, Wegher signed with the Panthers. He was inactive for all but one game in 2015.

On , Wegher's Panthers played in Super Bowl 50. He was inactive for the game. In the game, the Panthers fell to the Denver Broncos by a score of 24–10.

On , Wegher was waived by the Panthers as part of final roster cuts.

Los Angeles Rams
On , Wegher was signed to the Rams' practice squad. On , he was waived by the Rams.

References

1990 births
American football running backs
Carolina Panthers players
Iowa Hawkeyes football players
Living people
Los Angeles Rams players
Morningside Mustangs football players
People from Union County, South Dakota
Players of American football from South Dakota